Pınarlıkaya is a village in the Üzümlü District, Erzincan Province, Turkey. The village is populated by Kurds of the Balaban tribe and had a population of 58 in 2021.

The hamlet of Koruk is attached to the village.

References 

Villages in Üzümlü District
Kurdish settlements in Erzincan Province